Bruce Tutvedt was a Republican Party member of the Montana Senate. He represented District 5 and then District 3.

2009 session
Tutvedt served his first session in the Republican-controlled upper chamber on the Montana Legislature.

References

1955 births
Living people
Republican Party Montana state senators
Montana State University alumni
Politicians from Kalispell, Montana
21st-century American politicians